Sky Soap was a satellite television channel operated by British Sky Broadcasting devoted to American and British soap operas that include Emmerdale Farm, Take the High Road, Families and Albion Market.

History
When Sky Channel was launched on the Astra satellite on 5 February 1989, the daytime schedule was overhauled and included a block of five soaps. The first, starting at 11.30am from Australia, The Sullivans, which was also still airing in some ITV regions. Next were four American daytime soaps – Another World, which had been airing on the channel since 1987, started at 12.00pm; followed by General Hospital from 12.55pm; and As the World Turns at 1.50pm and finally, Loving in a regular 2.45pm slot. A sixth soap opera, The Young Doctors was another Australian programme which also aired in an early evening slot at 5.00pm, before switching to mid-morning after a year.

The network changed its name to Sky One on 31 July 1989, The Sullivans, General Hospital and As the World Turns were all dropped, and in November 1990, more daytime soaps were added to the line-up, and The Bold and the Beautiful and The Young and the Restless were both inherited from BSB's Galaxy channel. In February 1991, Santa Barbara replaced Loving, which was also broadcast on the ITV network. By 1993, with the addition of Australian soaps E Street and Paradise Beach to the schedules, as well as a daytime repeat run of American primetime series Falcon Crest, the block of daily soap operas on Sky One ran from 10.30am through to 3.30pm.

In 1994, it was decided to move the American daytime soaps to a new dedicated channel and Sky Soap began broadcasting on 3 October 1994 from the Astra 1C satellite on weekdays between 8.00am and 12.00pm, the original line-up on the channel was: Loving, Peyton Place (which was eventually replaced by Santa Barbara), Guiding Light, As the World Turns and Another World.

Broadcast hours were soon changed to between 12.00pm and 4.00pm, and by 1997, Sky Soap was broadcasting from Astra 1B, and the hours were extended to 11.00am to 4.00pm. The only American daytime soaps airing by then were As the World Turns and Guiding Light, while old episodes of British soaps were added to the line-up, including Emmerdale Farm, Families and Take the High Road.

Poor viewing figures following the launch of Sky Digital led to the channel's closure on 30 April 1999.

Programming

American

 Another World
 As the World Turns
 Guiding Light
 Loving
 Peyton Place
 Santa Barbara

Australian
 E Street
 Paradise Beach

British

 Albion Market
 Emmerdale Farm 
 Families
 Take the High Road

References

External links
 Sky Soap at TVARK
 Sky contact number

Defunct television channels in the United Kingdom
Television channels and stations established in 1994
Television channels and stations disestablished in 1999
Sky television channels
1990s in the United Kingdom
1990s in British television
History of television in the United Kingdom